Goshen Township is a township in Clay County, Kansas, USA.  As of the 2000 census, its population was 92.

Geography
According to the USGS, it contains two cemeteries: Appleton and Central.

The streams of Carter Creek and Deadman Creek run through this township.

References
 USGS Geographic Names Information System (GNIS)

External links
 US-Counties.com
 City-Data.com

Townships in Clay County, Kansas
Townships in Kansas